Alice Springs town camps, officially called Alice Springs Community Living Areas, are Aboriginal communities within Alice Springs in the Northern Territory of Australia.  Their origins vary. Many were originally designed to accommodate people visiting Alice Springs from remote communities but, for many, they have become a permanent and often generational home.

Background 

Alice Springs town camps began as early as the 1880s when Europeans first came to Central Australia following John McDouall Stuart's expedition, which was soon followed by pastoralists and, from 1872, the telegraph line and the establishment of the Alice Springs Telegraph Station. As a direct result this Aboriginal people were forced from their lands and their camps, then called fringe camps, initially served as convenient ration distribution points and labour camps.

By the 1900s opposition to the camps grew and various measures were attempted to remove them, including forced "evacuations" to surrounding missions, like the Sacred Heart Mission at Arltunga, 1929 and 1960. The township of Alice Springs was also declared a prohibited area for Aboriginal people from 1929 to 1960.

However, things changed in the 1970s when town campers began demanding land tender, shelter and services and, in 1977, when they established the town camp governing body Tangentyere Council. Tangentyere is an Arrernte word meaning "all speaking together".

 there were between 1600 and 2000 people living in town camps permanently, many of whom receive many visitors from remote communities. The number of people living in the camps can almost double during major events in Alice Springs like the football carnival and the Alice Springs Show.

Each camp is a distinct Aboriginal community, based on language and kinship groups.

There is a high rate of domestic violence in the NT in general, including in the camps. Prominent anti-domestic violence campaigner and founding member of the Tangentyere Women’s Family Safety Group, 46-year-old R. Rubuntja, was murdered by her partner, who had a history of violent offences, in January 2021. She had been known for her advocacy: in 2017, she spoke to politicians in Parliament House, Canberra, about domestic violence in Central Australia, and helped to organise a large women's march against violence in Alice Springs. She was elected Town Camp President of her community at Anthepe Camp in 2019.

Existing town camps 
The following aims to be a comprehensive list of town camps:

Notable people 

 Shirleen Campbell, activist against family and domestic violence
Sally M. Nangala Mulda, artist, lives at Mpwetyerre (Abbotts)
 Albert Namatjira, artist, lived at Akngwertnarre (Morris Soak)
 Geoff Shaw, Aboriginal leader, lives at Mount Nancy

References

Sources

Further reading

External links 

Alice Springs
Indigenous Australian communities